Elizabeth Quay Bus Station, formerly the Esplanade Busport, is a Transperth bus station, located at the southern edge of the Perth CBD in Western Australia, next to the Perth Convention Exhibition Centre and Elizabeth Quay railway station. It has 35 stands and is served by 55 Transperth routes operated by Path Transit, Swan Transit and Transdev WA. It is also served by South West Coach Lines services.

Description 
Elizabeth Quay Bus Station is located west of Elizabeth Quay railway station, adjacent to Mounts Bay Road, the Perth Convention Exhibition Centre, and the Ernst & Young Building. There are bus access points to the north-west (Mounts Bay Road and Mills Street), north (Mounts Bay Road westbound, entry only), and south-east (Kwinana Freeway ramps and William Street). The passenger entrances are at the north and south ends of the upper level concourse, and there are multiple pedestrian bridges connecting the bus station to the buildings north of Mounts Bay Road. The concourse sits above five ground-level platforms, which are labelled A to E. Each platform has seven stands, identified by the platform letter and a digit (1 to 7). Buses servicing the northernmost Platform A run west to east along the platform (stand A1 to stand A7), while buses for the other platforms travel from east to west (stands 7 to 1 for each platform).

History

Elizabeth Quay Bus Station was opened as City Busport on 30 November 1991 by Premier Carmen Lawrence. It was renamed Esplanade Busport in September 2004. On 31 January 2016, Esplanade Busport and Esplanade railway station were renamed to Elizabeth Quay Bus Station and Elizabeth Quay railway station. The renaming was controversial; the estimated cost was $700,000, at a time when the state government was running a significant budget deficit.

Bus routes
Many bus services start and terminate at the Elizabeth Quay Bus Station:

Platform A

Platform B

Platform C

Platform D (St George Tce Service Bound)

Platform E (St George Tce Service Bound)

Accidents and incidents

On 15 July 2015, a gas-fuelled Mercedes-Benz OC 500 LE caught fire whilst stationary in the 4th lane (more commonly known as lane D). During the fire, the building above the Busport was evacuated as a safety precaution. No-one was injured and it was said that the fire was caused by a coolant leak. The bus cost an estimated $750,000 and was completely destroyed in the fire.

Gallery

References

External links

Bus stations in Perth, Western Australia
Elizabeth Quay